Eulimella bogii is a species of sea snail, a marine gastropod mollusk in the family Pyramidellidae, the pyrams and their allies.

Description
The shell grows to a length of 3.2 mm.

Distribution
This species occurs in the following locations: at depths between 100 m  and 550 m 
 European waters (ERMS scope) : Mediterranean Sea
 Portuguese Exclusive Economic Zone : Madeira
 Spanish Exclusive Economic Zone : Canary Islands

References

External links
 
 To CLEMAM
 To Encyclopedia of Life
 To World Register of Marine Species

bogii
Gastropods described in 1995